The Durham County Challenge Cup (commonly known as the Durham Challenge Cup) is an annual football competition held between the clubs of the Durham County Football Association which was first played in 1884.  It is the senior county cup for the historic county of Durham, which includes Durham, Darlington, Gateshead, Hartlepool, South Tyneside, Stockton-on-Tees, and Sunderland. The first winners were Sunderland.

List of winners
Complete list of Durham Challenge Cup winners since its first edition:

1883–84: Sunderland
1884–85: Darlington
1885–86: Bishop Auckland Church Institute
1886–87: Sunderland
1887–88: Sunderland
1888–89: Sunderland Albion
1889–90: Sunderland
1890–91: Darlington
1891–92: Bishop Auckland
1892–93: Darlington
1893–94: Sunderland 'A'
1894–95: Stockton
1895–96: Tow Law
1896–97: Darlington
1897–98: Stockton
1898–99: Bishop Auckland
1899–1900: Jarrow
1900–01: Sunderland 'A'
1901–02: Sunderland 'A'
1902–03: Sunderland 'A'
1903–04: Sunderland 'A'
1904–05: Leadgate Park F.C.
1905–06: Sunderland 'A'
1906–07: Sunderland 'A'
1907–08: Shildon Athletic
1908–09: Hartlepools United
1909–10: Hartlepools United
1910–11: South Shields
1911–12: Sunderland 'A'
1912–13: Sunderland 'A'
1913–14: South Shields
1918–19: Sunderland 'A'
1919–20: Darlington
1920–21: Leadgate Park F.C.
1921–22: Sunderland 'A'
1922–23: Sunderland 'A'
1923–24: Ferryhill Athletic
1924–25: Sunderland 'A'
1925–26: Shildon
1926–27: Crook Town
1927–28: Sunderland 'A'
1928–29: Sunderland 'A'
1929–30: Spennymoor United
1930–31: Bishop Auckland
1931–32: Crook Town
1932–33: Jarrow
1933–34: Jarrow
1934–35: Stockton
1935–36: Horden Colliery Welfare
1936–37: South Shields
1937–38: South Shields
1938–39: Bishop Auckland
1939–40: Blackhall Colliery Welfare
1945–46: Spennymoor United
1946–47: Blackhall Colliery Welfare
1947–48: Consett
1948–49: South Shields
1949–50: Consett
1950–51: Stockton
1951–52: Bishop Auckland
1952–53: Annfield Plain
1953–54: Spennymoor United
1954–55: Crook Town
1955–56: Bishop Auckland
1956–57: Hartlepools United
1957–58: Hartlepools United
1958–59: Consett
1959–60: Crook Town
1960–61: Consett
1961–62: Bishop Auckland
1962–63: Spennymoor United
1963–64: Horden Colliery Welfare
1964–65: West Auckland Town
1965–66: Sunderland Reserves
1966–67: Bishop Auckland
1967–68: Spennymoor United
1968–69: Consett
1969–70: Evenwood Town
1970–71: Ferryhill Athletic
1971–72: Shildon
1972–73: Spennymoor United
1973–74: Spennymoor United
1974–75: Spennymoor United
1975–76: Spennymoor United
1976–77: South Shields
1977–78: Ryhope Colliery Welfare
1978–79: Spennymoor United
1979–80: Seaham Red Star
1980–81: Horden Colliery Welfare
1981–82: Horden Colliery Welfare
1982–83: Spennymoor United
1983–84: Coundon TT
1984–85: Bishop Auckland
1985–86: Bishop Auckland
1986–87: Coundon TT
1987–88: Bishop Auckland
1988–89: Billingham Synthonia
1989–90: Eppleton Colliery Welfare
1990–91: Billingham Synthonia
1991–92: Hebburn
1992–93: Murton
1993–94: Spennymoor United
1994–95: Spennymoor United
1995–96: Spennymoor United
1996–97: Spennymoor United
1997–98: Bishop Auckland
1998–99: Bishop Auckland
1999–2000: Darlington Reserves
2000–01: Bishop Auckland
2001–02: Bishop Auckland
2002–03: Horden Colliery Welfare
2003–04: Billingham Town
2004–05: Hartlepool United Reserves
2005–06: Whickham
2006–07: Consett
2007–08: Sunderland Reserves
2008–09: Billingham Synthonia
2009–10: Billingham Synthonia
2010–11: Gateshead Reserves
2011–12: Spennymoor Town
2012–13: Bishop Auckland
2013–14: Shildon
2014–15: Shildon
2015–16: Newton Aycliffe
2016–17: South Shields
2017–18: Consett
2018–19: Shildon
2019-20: Spennymoor Town & Sunderland U23's (Shared)
2022: Ryhope Colliery Welfare

Notes

References

External links
Challenge Cup at Durham FA website

Football in County Durham
Recurring events established in 1884
County Cup competitions